Aubrey Rozzell (November 2, 1932 – October 14, 2015) was an American football linebacker. He played for the Pittsburgh Steelers in 1957 and for the Montreal Alouettes in 1958.

He died on October 14, 2015, in Quitman, Mississippi at age 82.

References

1932 births
2015 deaths
American football linebackers
Delta State Statesmen football players
Pittsburgh Steelers players
Montreal Alouettes players